Roche-le-Peyroux is a commune in the Corrèze department in central France.

Geography
The river Diège forms all of the commune's northern and eastern boundaries, then flows into the Dordogne, which forms all of its southern boundary.

Population

See also
Communes of the Corrèze department

References

Communes of Corrèze